Aroga danfengensis is a moth of the family Gelechiidae. It is found in China (Shaanxi).

The wingspan is about 14 mm for males and 15 mm for females. Adults are similar to Aroga gozmanyi, but can be distinguished by the yellow-white patch on the costal and posterior margins at two-thirds of the forewing.

References

Moths described in 1998
Aroga
Moths of Asia